Jim McDonald may refer to:

 Jim McDonald (halfback) (1915–1997), college and professional American football player
 Jim McDonald (American football coach) (1936–2012), American football coach
 Jim McDonald (footballer, born 1877) (1877–1968), Australian rules footballer for Essendon
 Jim McDonald (footballer, born 1887) (1887–1954), Australian rules footballer for Richmond
 Jim McDonald (footballer, born 1916) (1916-?), Australian rules footballer for Melbourne
 Jim McDonald (pitcher) (1927–2004), Major League Baseball pitcher
 Jim McDonald (basketball), former college player and coach, see 1981–82 NCAA Division I men's basketball season
 Jim McDonald (third baseman) (1860–1914), Major League Baseball third baseman
 Jim McDonald (outfielder), Major League Baseball outfielder
 Jim McDonald (Coronation Street), character in Coronation Street played by actor Charles Lawson
 Jim McDonald (soccer) (born 1954), Canadian soccer player from the 1970s
 Jim McDonald (electrical engineer), Vice Chancellor, University of Strathclyde
 Jim McDonald (Northern Ireland), Northern Irish Catholic Unionist
 Jim McDonald (Australian politician) (born 1967), member of the Queensland Legislative Assembly
 Jimmy McDonald (footballer, born 1883) (1883–1924), Scottish footballer
 Jimmy McDonald (athlete) (born 1964), Irish Olympic racewalker
 Jimmy McDonald (footballer, born 1932), Scottish footballer

See also 
 James McDonald (disambiguation)
 Jimmy MacDonald (sound effects artist) (1906–1991), Scottish voice actor; the voice of Mickey Mouse from 1947 to 1977